Dependence logic is a logical formalism, created by Jouko Väänänen, which adds dependence atoms to the language of first-order logic.

Dependence logic is a logic of imperfect information, like  branching quantifier logic or independence-friendly logic: in other words, its game theoretic semantics can be obtained from that of first-order logic by restricting the availability of information to the players, thus allowing for non-linearly ordered patterns of dependence and independence between variables. However, dependence logic differs from these logics in that it separates the notions of dependence and independence from the notion of quantification.

Syntax
The syntax of dependence logic is an extension of that of first-order logic. For a fixed signature σ = (Sfunc, Srel, ar), the set of all well-formed dependence logic formulas is defined according to the following rules:

Terms
Terms in dependence logic are defined precisely as in first-order logic.

Atomic formulas
There are three types of atomic formulas in dependence logic: 
 A relational atom is an expression of the form  for any n-ary relation  in our signature and for any n-uple of terms ;
 A dependence atom is an expression of the form , for any  and for any n-uple of terms . 

Nothing else is an atomic formula of dependence logic. 

Relational and equality atoms are also called first order atoms.

Complex formulas and sentences

For a fixed signature σ, the set of all formulas  of dependence logic and their respective sets of free variables  are defined as follows: 

Nothing is a dependence logic formula unless it can be obtained through a finite number of applications of these four rules.

A formula  such that  is a sentence of dependence logic.

Conjunction and universal quantification
In the above presentation of the syntax of dependence logic, conjunction and universal quantification are not treated as primitive operators; rather, they are defined in terms of disjunction and negation and existential quantification respectively, by means of De Morgan's Laws. 

Semantics
The team semantics for dependence logic is a variant of Wilfrid Hodges' compositional semantics for IF logic. There exist equivalent game-theoretic semantics for dependence logic, both in terms of imperfect information games and in terms of perfect information games.

Teams
Let  be a first-order structure and let  be a finite set of variables.

It may be helpful to visualize such a team as a database relation with attributes  and with only one data type, corresponding to the domain  of the structure: for example, if the team  consists of four assignments  with domain  then one may represent it as the relation

Positive and negative satisfaction

The necessity of considering positive and negative satisfaction separately is a consequence of the fact that in dependence logic, as in the logic of branching quantifiers or in IF logic, the law of the excluded middle does not hold; alternatively, one may assume that all formulas are in negation normal form, using De Morgan's relations in order to define universal quantification and conjunction from existential quantification and disjunction respectively, and consider positive satisfaction alone. 

Given a sentence , we say that  is true in  if and only if , and we say that  is false in  if and only if .

Semantic rules
As for the case of Alfred Tarski's satisfiability relation for first-order formulas, the positive and negative satisfiability relations of the team semantics for dependence logic are defined by structural induction over the formulas of the language.

Positive satisfiability
  if and only if 
  if and only if 
  if and only if ;
  if and only if there exist teams  and  such that 
 '
 ;
 ; 

Negative satisfiability
  if and only if 
  if and only if 
  if and only if  is the empty team;
  if and only if ;

Dependence logic and other logics

Dependence logic and first-order logic
Dependence logic is a conservative extension of first-order logic: in other words, for every first order sentence  and structure  we have that  if and only if  is true in  according to the usual first order semantics. Furthermore, for any first order formula ,  if and only if all assignments  satisfy  in  according to the usual first order semantics.

However, dependence logic is strictly more expressive than first order logic: for example, the sentence 
 
is true in a model  if and only if the domain of this model is infinite, even though no first order formula  has this property.

Dependence logic and second-order logic
Every dependence logic sentence is equivalent to some sentence in the existential fragment of second-order logic, that is, to some second-order sentence of the form 

where  does not contain second-order quantifiers. 
Conversely, every second-order sentence in the above form is equivalent to some dependence logic sentence.

As for open formulas, dependence logic corresponds to the downwards monotone fragment of existential second-order logic, in the sense that a nonempty class of teams is definable by a dependence logic formula if and only if the corresponding class of relations is downwards monotone and definable by an existential second-order formula.

Dependence logic and branching quantifiers
Branching quantifiers are expressible in terms of dependence atoms: for example, the expression
 
is equivalent to the dependence logic sentence , in the sense that the former expression is true in a model if and only if the latter expression is true.  

Conversely, any dependence logic sentence is equivalent to some sentence in the logic of branching quantifiers, since all existential second-order sentences are expressible in branching quantifier logic.

Dependence logic and IF logic
Any dependence logic sentence is logically equivalent to some IF logic sentence, and vice versa. 

However, the issue is subtler when it comes to open formulas. Translations between IF logic and dependence logic formulas, and vice versa, exist as long as the domain of the team is fixed: in other words, for all sets of variables  and all IF logic formulas  with free variables in  there exists a dependence logic formula  such that 

for all structures  and for all teams  with domain , and conversely, for every dependence logic formula  with free variables in  there exists an IF logic formula  such that 

for all structures  and for all teams  with domain . These translations cannot be compositional.

Properties
Dependence logic formulas are downwards closed: if  and  then . Furthermore, the empty team (but not the team containing the empty assignment) satisfies all formulas of Dependence Logic, both positively and negatively. 

The law of the excluded middle fails in dependence logic: for example, the formula  is neither positively nor negatively satisfied by the team . Furthermore, disjunction is not idempotent and does not distribute over conjunction.  

Both the compactness theorem and the Löwenheim-Skolem theorem are true for dependence logic.

As IF logic, Dependence logic can define its own truth operator: more precisely, there exists a formula  such that for every sentence  of dependence logic and all models  which satisfy Peano's axioms, if  is the Gödel number of  then 
  if and only if 

This does not contradict Tarski's undefinability theorem, since the negation of dependence logic is not the usual contradictory one.

Complexity
As a consequence of Fagin's theorem, the properties of finite structures definable in 
dependence logic correspond exactly to NP properties. Furthermore, Durand and Kontinen showed that restricting the number of universal quantifiers or the arity of dependence atoms in 
sentences gives rise to hierarchy theorems with respect to expressive power.

The inconsistency problem of dependence logic is semidecidable, and in fact equivalent to the inconsistency problem for first-order logic. 
However, the decision problem for dependence logic is non-arithmetical, and is in fact complete with respect to the   class of the Levy hierarchy.

Variants and extensions

Team logic
Team logic  extends dependence logic with a contradictory negation . Its expressive power is equivalent to that of full second-order logic.

Modal dependence logic
The dependence atom, or a suitable variant thereof, can be added to the language of modal logic, thus obtaining modal dependence logic.

Intuitionistic dependence logic
As it is, dependence logic lacks an implication. The intuitionistic implication , whose name derives from the similarity between its definition and that of the implication of intuitionistic logic, can be defined as follows:
  if and only if for all  such that  it holds that .

Intuitionistic dependence logic, that is, dependence logic supplemented with the intuitionistic implication, is equivalent to second-order logic.

Independence logic
The semantics of these atoms is defined as follows:
Independence logic corresponds to existential second-order logic, in the sense that a non-empty class of teams is definable by an independence logic formula if and only if the corresponding class of relations is definable by an existential second-order formula. Therefore, on the level of open formulas, independence logic is strictly stronger in expressive power than dependence logic. However, on the level of sentences these logics are equivalent.

Inclusion/exclusion logic
The semantics of these atoms is defined as follows:

  if and only if for all  there exists  such that ;
  if and only if for all  it holds that .

Inclusion/exclusion logic has the same expressive power as independence logic, already on the level of open formulas. Inclusion logic and exclusion logic are obtained by adding only inclusion atoms or exclusion atoms to first-order logic, respectively. Inclusion logic sentences correspond in expressive power to greatest fixed-point logic sentences; hence inclusion logic captures (least) fixed-point logic on finite models, and PTIME over finite ordered models. Exclusion logic in turn corresponds to dependence logic in expressive power.

Generalized quantifiers
Another way of extending dependence logic is to add some generalized quantifiers to the language of dependence logic. Very recently there has been some study of dependence logic with monotone generalized quantifiers and dependence logic with a certain majority quantifier, the latter leading to a new descriptive complexity characterization of the counting hierarchy.

See also 
 Game semantics
 Branching quantifier
 Independence-friendly logic

Notes

References

External links 

 Special issue of Studia Logica on  "Dependence and Independence in Logic", containing a number of articles on Dependence Logic
 Presentations in Academy Colloquium Dependence Logic, Amsterdam, 2014
Systems of formal logic